Malacoctenus gigas, the Sonora blenny, is a species of labrisomid blenny endemic to the Gulf of California.  It is a shallow water species inhabiting patches of seaweed on reefs.  This species can reach a length of  TL.

References

gigas
Fish of the Gulf of California
Fish described in 1959
Taxa named by Victor G. Springer